Netball in Scotland is a popular sport played mainly by women.

National team
The Scotland national netball team competes in international netball tournaments such as the Netball World Cup, the Commonwealth Games, the European Netball Championship and the Netball Singapore Nations Cup.  , Scotland are 8th in the INF World Rankings.

Netball Superleague
Two Scottish teams have also competed in the Netball Superleague.

Venues

 Commonwealth Arena
 Kelvin Hall International Sports Arena
 SEC Centre
 SSE Hydro

International tournaments
Scotland hosted the following international tournaments.

References

External links 
Netball Scotland